Ilias may refer to:

 the Iliad, an ancient Greek epos
 Ilias (name), a personal name (including a list of people with the name)
 ILIAS, a web-based learning management system
 6604 Ilias, an asteroid

See also
 Profitis Ilias (disambiguation)
 Agios Ilias (disambiguation)
 Ilijaš, a town and municipality in Bosnia and Herzegovina
 Ilyas (disambiguation)
 Elias
 Illas, a municipality in Spain
 Ilya (disambiguation)